The 1920 Columbia Lions football team was an American football team that represented Columbia University as an independent during the 1920 college football season. In his first season, head coach Frank "Buck" O'Neill led the team to a 4–4 record, but the Lions were outscored  by opponents.  

The team played most of its games on South Field, part of the university's campus in Morningside Heights in Upper Manhattan.

Schedule

References

Columbia
Columbia Lions football seasons
Columbia Lions football